Juan Fernando Brügge (born June 24, 1962) is an Argentine politician, vice president of the Christian Democratic Party of Argentina and former Deputy of the Argentine Nation for the Province of Córdoba within the UNA parliamentary bloc.

Early years
Juan Fernando Brügge was born in the city of Córdoba, on June 24, 1962. His family, by father, is of German origin, from the small town of Werl, north of Germany, and by his mother is of French descent.

Career path 
Brügge attended Colegio Nacional de Monserrat before entering the National University of Córdoba. He graduated with a law degree in 1985.

Since 1987 he has been Professor of Constitutional Procedural Law at the National University of Córdoba.

From 1989 until 2014 was adjunct professor of the subject Constitutional Right in the Catholic University of Córdoba.

In 2007 he was elected to the Chamber of Deputies of his province.

From April 30, 2013 to December 10, 2015  Brügge served as one of the directors of the Bank of the Province of Córdoba.

Afterwards Brügge was the chairman of the Christian Democratic Party (PDC) from 2011 to 2015.

And in 2015 he was elected to the Chamber of Deputies for his province, representing the centrist Christian Democratic Party, part of the United for a New Alternative political coalition.

Brügge chairs the commission of Communications and Information Technologyn of the Lower House.

See also
 List of political parties in Argentina
 Politics of Argentina
 Christian democracy

References

External links
 Brügge brings forward his agenda. Interview by Nicolas Carver

1962 births
Living people
Argentine people of German descent
Argentine people of French descent
People from Córdoba, Argentina
National University of Córdoba alumni
Argentine anti-abortion activists
Argentine Roman Catholics
20th-century Argentine lawyers
Members of the Argentine Chamber of Deputies elected in Córdoba
Christian Democratic Party (Argentina) politicians